Rosedale, also known as Pretty Prospects, the Uriah Forrest House, and the Coonley Estate, is an historic home and grounds located at 3501 Newark Street, Northwest, Washington, D.C., in the Cleveland Park Historic District. The property is a National Register of Historic Places and District of Columbia landmark.

History
The Rosedale Farmhouse was built in 1793 by Revolutionary War Colonel Uriah Forrest 
A small stone cottage constructed in 1740 was incorporated into the house, making Rosedale the oldest surviving house in what is now Washington, DC. The house is set in terraced grounds that are the last remnant of an estate that once encompassed all of what is now Cleveland Park.
 
Rosedale was owned by Forrest descendants until 1920.
In 1920, it was purchased by Queene Coonley, the widow of Avery Coonley, owner of Frank Lloyd Wright's Coonley House in Riverside, Illinois, who had rented the house beginning in 1917.

The house was  rented to Undersecretary of State William Phillips in 1933, and to John N. Irwin, II in 1959. It was a faculty residence for the National Cathedral School. In 1977, the youth exchange organization Youth For Understanding bought the premises. YFU sold Rosedale to The Rosedale Conservancy, a local trust, in 2002. A renovation project was carried out by Muse Architects in that year.

Rosedale is listed on the National Register of Historic Places, and is a contributing property to the Cleveland Park Historic District.

See also 
National Register of Historic Places listings in Washington, D.C.

References

Houses on the National Register of Historic Places in Washington, D.C.
Historic district contributing properties in Washington, D.C.
Houses completed in 1793
1793 establishments in Washington, D.C.